Touch Down (Remix) is a song by
British recording rapper Stylo G and Jamaican singer Vybz Kartel and American rapper Nicki Minaj. It is a remix of the song "Touch Down" by Stylo G. The song's lyrics are credited to The FaNaTiX, Stylo G & Minaj, and production was handled by The FaNaTiX .

Composition

"Touch Down" was written and produced by The FaNaTiX, Stylo G and Minaj. It features vocals from Vybz Kartel and FaNaTiX provided additional production and mixed the song. "Touch Down" is a dancehall and Hip-Hop song. Nicki Minaj announced the remix on December 4, 2018.

Live performances

During the concert in England London and Birmingham as part of The Nicki Wrld Tour on March 14 and 17, 2019, Stylo G joined Minaj onstage to perform "Touchdown" remix.

Track listing

References

2018 singles
Nicki Minaj songs
Stylo G songs
Songs written by Nicki Minaj
2018 songs